Chenanda C. Machaiah (born 8 March 1954)  is a boxer from Karnataka, India. He was one of the earliest boxers to represent India internationally. He represented India as a boxer in the 1976 at Montreal, losing in the first round in the Light Welterweight (– 63.5 kg) category.

He also represented India on 11 occasions, including the Asian Boxing Championships at Jakarta (1977), the Indo-USSR Tournament in USSR (1977), the XIth Commonwealth Games at Edmonton (1978) and the 8th Asian Games at Bangkok. He won a total of 6 international medals including one gold. He is the recipient of the "Arjuna Award" in 1978-79, the highest sports honour for a sportsman in India.

See also
Boxing at the 1976 Summer Olympics

References

External links
 

1954 births
Living people
Recipients of the Arjuna Award
Indian male boxers
Olympic boxers of India
Sportspeople from Bangalore
Kodava people
Asian Games medalists in boxing
Boxers at the 1976 Summer Olympics
Boxers at the 1978 Commonwealth Games
Boxers at the 1982 Commonwealth Games
Commonwealth Games bronze medallists for India
Boxers at the 1978 Asian Games
Boxers at the 1982 Asian Games
Commonwealth Games medallists in boxing
Boxers from Karnataka
Asian Games bronze medalists for India
Medalists at the 1978 Asian Games
Medalists at the 1982 Asian Games
Light-welterweight boxers
Medallists at the 1982 Commonwealth Games